Emil Wingstedt (born 9 May 1975) is a Swedish orienteering competitor. He won the 2005 and 2006 Sprint World Orienteering Championships, and finished third on the long distance in 2003. He is Relay World Champion from 2003 with the Swedish team, as well as having a silver medal from 2007, and bronze medals from  2004 and 2006. He is a four-time European Champion, winning the Sprint distance in 2002, 2004, 2006 and 2008. He won the classical relay race Tiomila in 2006, 2007 and 2012 with his club team Halden SK.

He has been ranked no. 1 on the IOF (International Orienteering Federation) World Ranking (in 2001).

References

External links
 
 

 

1975 births
Living people
Swedish orienteers
Male orienteers
Foot orienteers
World Orienteering Championships medalists
Competitors at the 2001 World Games
World Games bronze medalists
World Games medalists in orienteering
21st-century Swedish people